Rigvedic deities are deities mentioned in the sacred texts of Rigveda, the principal text of the historical Vedic religion of the Vedic period (1500–500 BCE). 

There are 1,028 hymns (sūkta) in the Rigveda. Most of these hymns are dedicated to specific deities. 

The most prominent deity is Surya; Agni the sacrificial fire and messenger of the gods; and Soma, the ritual drink dedicated to Indra, are additional principal deities.

Deities by prominence
List of Rigvedic deities by a number of dedicated hymns, after Griffith. Some dedications are to paired deities, such as Indra-Agni, Mitra-Varuna, Soma-Rudra, here counted double. Visvedevas (all gods together) have been invoked 70 times.
Indra 250
Agni 200
Soma 123
Aśvins 56
Varuna 46
Maruts 38
Mitra 28
Ushas 21
Vayu (Wind) 12
Savitr 11
the Rbhus 11
Pushan 10
the Apris 9
Brhaspati 8
Surya (Sun) 8
Dyáuṣ Pitṛ́ and Pṛthvī Mātṛ́ (Heaven and Earth) 6, plus 5.84 dedicated to Earth alone
Apas (Waters) 6
Adityas 6
Vishnu 4, plus 2 paired hymns 1.155 dedicated to Vishnu-Indra & hymn 6.69 dedicated to Indra-Vishnu. A total of 5 i.e. (4+1/2+1/2) hymns
Brahmanaspati 6
Rudra 4, plus a paired hymn 6.74 dedicated to both Soma-Rudra. A total of 41/2 i.e. (4+1/2) hymns
Dadhikras 4
Yama (Death) 4
the Sarasvati River / Sarasvati 3
Parjanya (Rain) 3
Vāc (Speech) 2 (mentioned 130 times, deified e.g. in 10.125)
Vastospati 2
Vishvakarman 2
Manyu 2
Kapinjala (the Heathcock, a form of Indra) 2

Minor deities (one single or no dedicated hymn)
 Chitragupta, son of Lord Brahma mentioned RIG VEDA Book 8/ Hymn 21/ Stanza 18
 Manas (Thought), prominent concept, deified in 10.58
Dakshina (Reward for priests and poets), prominent concept, deified in 10.107
Purusha ("Cosmic Man"  of the Purusha sukta 10.90)
Arayani
Ratri
Aditi
Shachi
Bhaga
Vasukra
Atri
Apam Napat
Ksetrapati
Ghrta
Nirrti
Asamati
Urvasi
Pururavas
Vena
Aranyani
Mayabheda
Tarksya
Tvastar
Saranyu

See also

Historical Vedic religion

References

Sources

External links

 
Deities
Indo-European deities
Hindu deities